Fox Park (officially Sally Fox Park) is a  public park in Molalla, Oregon, United States.

Features
Fox Park features a playground, splash pad, basketball area, and restrooms. A gazebo was built in the park in 2011; the structure cost $25,000 and was funded in part by the Ford Family Foundation.

History
Fox Park hosted National Night Out in 2013. Approximately 1,000 people gathered in the park to attend a viewing party for the solar eclipse of August 21, 2017, hosted by the Molalla Public Library.

References

External links

 

Molalla, Oregon
Parks in Clackamas County, Oregon